Log is a small village in the Municipality of Mokronog-Trebelno in southeastern Slovenia. It lies on the right bank of the Mirna River west of Mokronog in the historical region of Lower Carniola. The municipality is now included in the Southeast Slovenia Statistical Region.

References

External links

Log on Geopedia

Populated places in the Municipality of Mokronog-Trebelno